This is a list of speed metal bands. Speed metal is a subgenre of heavy metal music that originated in the late 1970s from NWOBHM and hardcore punk roots. It is described by AllMusic as "extremely fast, abrasive, and technically demanding" music.


List of bands

See also 
 List of heavy metal bands by genre

References

External links 
 

Lists of extreme heavy metal bands